Harpswell Coastal Academy is a Charter School serving grades 5–12 with campuses located in Brunswick, Maine and Harpswell, Maine. The school is funded by the State of Maine. It was one of nine school districts in the state to receive federal funding under the Rethinking Remote Education Venture.

References

External links
 

Schools in Cumberland County, Maine
Education in Brunswick, Maine